Malik Nabers (born July 28, 2003) is an American football wide receiver for the LSU Tigers.

High school career
Nabers attended Ovey Comeaux High School in Lafayette, Louisiana before transferring to Southside High School in Youngsville, Louisiana for his senior year. He was unable to play football his senior year due to his transfer waiver being denied. In his final season of playing high school football, he had 58 receptions for 1,223 yards and 21 touchdowns. Nabers originally committed to Mississippi State University to play college football before switching to Louisiana State University (LSU).

College career
As a true freshman at LSU in 2021, Nabers played in 11 games with six starts and had 28 receptions for 417 yards and four touchdowns. He returned to LSU as a starter in 2022.

References

External links
LSU Tigers bio

Living people
Players of American football from Louisiana
American football wide receivers
LSU Tigers football players
2003 births